Building a Province: 60 Alberta Lives is a book of short biographical profiles written by Irish-Canadian author Brian Brennan. It takes as its point of departure the feature obituaries Brennan wrote while working as a staff columnist with the Calgary Herald between 1992 and 1999.
 
The book made the first of six weekly appearances on the Calgary Herald bestsellers list on Nov. 11, 2000, rising to the number one position on Jan. 6, 2001.

The profiled Albertans include the following:

 Bill Gold
 Leonard Gaetz
 Sir James Lougheed
 Bob Edwards
 Henry Wise Wood
 Victoria Calihoo
 Henry Marshall Tory
 Richard Gavin Reid
 J. Percy Page
 Chief Buffalo Child Long Lance
 Kathleen Parlow
 Morris Shumiatcher
 Eric Harvie
 Jock Palmer
 Betty Mitchell
 Peggy Holmes
 Stastia Cross Carry
 Carl Anderson
 Vera Jacques Ireland
 Charlie Edgar
 Bert Sheppard
 Catherine Barclay
 Grant MacEwan
 George DuPre
 Hazel Braithwaite
 Mary Dover
 James H. Gray
 Kerry Wood
 Alice Murdoch Adams
 Arnold Platt
 Nicholas Morant
 Melvin "Fritz" Hanson
 Fred C. Mannix
 Violet Archer
 Harry Strom
 Jimmy "the Con" Carleton
 W.O. Mitchell
 Jean Hoare
 Father Pat O'Byrne
 Jack Gallagher
 William Morrow
 Betty O'Hanlon
 Webster Macdonald Sr.
 Stan Waters
 Clarence Horatius Miller
 Roloff Beny
 Bill Pratt
 Alexander Gray
 Bob Hatfield
 Glen Gorbous
 Johnny Bright
 Bob Johnson
 Walter Twinn
 Helen Collinson
 Grant Notley
 Sheldon Chumir
 David Walsh
 Allan Stein

Citations

2000 non-fiction books
20th-century history books
History of Alberta
Fitzhenry & Whiteside books